The 2015 Zuiderduin Masters is a BDO/WDF darts tournament that took place in Egmond aan Zee, Netherlands.

Men results

Men's tournament

Group stage
All matches best of 9 legs. Two points are gained for every match won.
P = Played; W = Won; L = Lost; LF = Legs for; LA = Legs against; +/- = Leg difference; Pts = Points

Group A

Group B

Group C

Group D

Group E

Group F

Group G

Group H

Knockout stages

Zuiderduin Masters
2015 in Dutch sport
Finder Darts Masters